Achord is an unincorporated community in Dodge County, in the U.S. state of Georgia.

History
A post office called Achord was established in 1898, and remained in operation until 1905. Besides the post office, Achord had a rail depot.

References

Unincorporated communities in Dodge County, Georgia
Unincorporated communities in Georgia (U.S. state)